Route 201 is a north/south provincial highway within the Canadian province of Quebec, running between Route 202 in Franklin (near the Canada–US border) and Route 342 in Rigaud.  Its total length is approximately 70 kilometres.

Route 201 links Salaberry-de-Valleyfield with Autoroute 20 using the Monseigneur Langlois Bridge to cross the Saint Lawrence River. It is among the four primary or secondary highways to cross the Saint Lawrence River and is the only 200 series highway to be partly north of that river.

Municipalities along Route 201

 Franklin
 Ormstown
 Saint-Stanislas-de-Kostka
 Salaberry-de-Valleyfield
 Coteau-du-Lac
 Saint-Clet
 Saint-Lazare
 Sainte-Marthe
 Rigaud

Major intersections

See also
List of Quebec provincial highways

References

External links
Route 201 on Google Maps
 Official Transport Quebec Road Map (Courtesy of the Quebec Ministry of Transportation) 

201
Roads in Montérégie